The 91st Regiment of Foot (Shropshire Volunteers) had a brief existence as a British Army infantry regiment between 1779 and 1784. It was raised in Shropshire, posted to the West Indies, where much property was destroyed in a hurricane, and disbanded in 1784.

The Colonel of the regiment throughout its life was Colonel Dudley Ackland.

References

Infantry regiments of the British Army
Military units and formations established in 1779
Military units and formations disestablished in 1784